Sheila Crossley (also Birtles) is a fictional character from the British soap opera Coronation Street. She was portrayed by actress Eileen Mayers. The character is famous for her suicide plot which was ultimately axed.

Casting
Mayers left the series in 1963 and was asked to return for two episodes in 1969. In 1974, the actress returned to filming for another stint as Sheila.

Storylines
Through his many faults, Sheila fell hard for Neil Crossley (Geoffrey Matthews), so much so that she did not see how badly he treated her. Neil only thought of Sheila as a bit of fun and after he stood her up on a date, she confronted him. Angered, Neil hit Sheila and left, leaving her devastated and she sank into a deep depression. She pushed her friends away and lost her job for not turning up. After she and Neil met again and he told her in no uncertain terms that they were over, Sheila attempted suicide but was found by Dennis Tanner (Philip Lowrie). On the doctor's recommendation, Sheila left Weatherfield and moved in with her parents. Whilst there, Sheila discovered she was pregnant and gave birth to a baby boy in 1964, who she named Danny, before giving him up for adoption.

In 1966, Sheila was set up on a blind date by a friend and was shocked to find her date was Jerry Booth (Graham Haberfield), who she went on an unsuccessful date with years ago. Sheila and Jerry reconnected and Sheila returned to Weatherfield and moved in with Elsie Tanner's (Pat Phoenix), securing a job at the new factory. Sheila and Jerry quickly fell in love and intended to marry but when Sheila bumped into Neil later that year, her feelings for him came rushing back and Neil proposed. Jerry was heartbroken when Sheila left with Neil.

Reception
After learning that Sheila's character was to commit suicide in 1963, the public was outraged. Instead, it was re-written and viewers saw the character take pills before the screen faded to black. Actress Eileen Mayers has claimed that "It was disappointing, it was good and it wasn't shown", referring to the suicide scenes. However, in 2011, the scenes were shown in the documentary The Corrie Years. Upon the announcement that the scenes were to air 50 years later, a Coronation Street insider told the Daily Mirror that "At the time it was deemed too controversial. But compared to what goes on in soaps these days, I don't think the scene will be very shocking." The character's suicide plot has been compared to that of Natasha Blakeman's in 2010 in the soap.

References

Coronation Street characters
Television characters introduced in 1961
Female characters in television
Fictional attempted suicides
Fictional factory workers
Fictional machinists